Kate Chiwedu Obilor (born 17 July 1985) is a retired Nigerian hurdler who specialized in the 400 metres hurdles.

She won the gold medal at the 2001 West African Championships, the silver medal at the 2003 All-Africa Games, finished fifth at the 2006 African Championships and also won a silver medal in the 4 × 400 metres relay there.

Her personal best time was 56.50 seconds, achieved in July 2001 in Lagos.

References

1985 births
Living people
Nigerian female hurdlers
African Games silver medalists for Nigeria
African Games medalists in athletics (track and field)
Athletes (track and field) at the 2003 All-Africa Games
21st-century Nigerian women